Willem II is a football club based in Tilburg, North Brabant, Netherlands. They play their home games at Koning Willem II Stadion which has a capacity of 14,637. During the 2014–15 campaign they competed in the Eredivisie and KNVB Cup.

Competitions

Eredivisie

League table

Matches

KNVB Beker

References

External links
Official website 

Willem II
Willem II (football club) seasons